Dagetichthys lakdoensis is a species of freshwater sole native to the Bénoué basin in Cameroon, with recent records from Nigeria in the Niger Delta.  This species grows to a length of  TL.  This species is one of only two known members of its genus, the other being the marine Dagetichthys lusitanica.

References
 

Soleidae
Fish described in 1964